Bogdan Petričević (born 6 September 1989) is a Montenegrin handball player who plays for SC Meran Handball (Italy) and the Montenegrin national team.

References

1989 births
Living people
Montenegrin male handball players
Olympiacos H.C. players
Sportspeople from Cetinje
Expatriate handball players
Montenegrin expatriate sportspeople in France